Herbert Golder (born 1952) is a professor of Classical Studies at Boston University. He has a Ph.D. in classical languages and literature from Yale University.

His specialty is Greek mythology and he has to his credit a number of books and films. He played Rabbi Edelmann in the Werner Herzog film Invincible, he was also an assistant director on that film and the co-writer of My Son, My Son, What Have Ye Done?.

In addition, he is the Editor-in-Chief of Arion: A Journal of Humanities and the Classics.

External links
 
 Boston University faculty page 

American male screenwriters
Boston University faculty
Living people
Yale University alumni
Screenwriters from Massachusetts
1952 births